Dobja Vas is a former settlement on the right bank of the Meža River and a neighborhood in urban area of Ravne na Koroškem in the Carinthia region in northern Slovenia. In 2017 it was merged into Ravne na Koroškem.

References

External links

Dobja Vas on Geopedia

Populated places in the Municipality of Ravne na Koroškem
Populated places disestablished in 2017